The Curaçao Rugby Federation is the governing body for rugby union within Curaçao. It is an associate member of Rugby Americas North which is the governing body for rugby union in North America and the Caribbean.

Curaçao played its first international in 2013, defeating Saint Vincent and the Grenadines 37-24.

See also
 Curaçao national rugby union team

External links
 Curaçao Rugby Federation on facebook.com
 Curaçao on nacrugby.com

Reference list

Rugby union in Curaçao
Rugby union governing bodies in North America
Sports governing bodies in Curaçao